Ranee Campen (born 24 December 1989)  or nicknamed Bella (เบลล่า) is a Thai actress and model. She is best known for her roles in the television dramas such as Porn Prom Onlaweng (2013), Khun Chai Puttipat (2013), Plerng Chimplee (2014), Padiwaradda (2016), Plerng Boon (2017), Bupphe Sanniwat (2018) and Krong Kam (2019) on Thailand's Channel 3.

Early life and education
Campen was born to a British father, Arnold Campen, and a Thai mother, Pranee. She is reportedly named after her great-grandmother, Bella Campen. Campen finished secondary school from Sarawittaya School. She graduated from Thammasat University with a bachelor's degree in Journalism and Mass communication, and as of 2015 was pursuing her master's degree in the same university.

Career
Campen started her entertainment career as model in advertisements. After about ten advertisements, she signed a contract with Channel 3 and became an actress with Channel 3 in 2011. Campen got her first leading role and first nomination for Porn Prom Onlaweng, in 2013, which had the fifth highest rating among all prime time dramas shown on Channel 3 during that year. After Khun Chai Puttipat was on air, it became the most frequently searched drama on Google in Thailand and ranked 4th in 2013 prime time drama ratings point comparison. Moreover, because of their vivid romantic scenes in the drama, Campen and Jirayu Tangsrisuk won "Fantasy Couple of the Year" at Kerd Award 2.0. In the same year, Campen played her second role as an elegant gentle lady in a prize-winning historical drama, Look Tard. Ever since then, Campen made her name as an actress, especially for period dramas. In 2014, she portrayed "Nuea Nang", an accomplished traditional dancer in drama Plerng Chimplee.

Filmography

Film

Television series

Music video appearances

Master of Ceremony: MC

Awards and nominations

References

External links
 
 

1989 births
Living people
Ranee Campen
Ranee Campen
Ranee Campen
Ranee Campen
Ranee Campen
Ranee Campen
Ranee Campen
Ranee Campen
Ranee Campen